Phil LaJoy is an American politician from Michigan. LaJoy was a member of Michigan House of Representatives for District 21.

Early life 
On May 28, 1944, LaJoy was born in Wayne, Michigan.

Education 
In 1972, LaJoy earned a Bachelor of Arts degree in Business from University of Detroit.

Career 
In military, LaJoy served in the United States Marine Corps.

On November 5, 2002, LaJoy won the election and became a Republican member of Michigan House of Representatives for District 21. LaJoy served District 21 until 2008. In 2008, LaJoy became a Township Supervisor for Canton, Michigan.

Personal life 
LaJoy's wife is Jean LaJoy. They have two children.

References 

Living people
Republican Party members of the Michigan House of Representatives
1944 births